Bruce Lee: The Curse of the Dragon is a 1993 documentary film about Bruce Lee. The film includes interviews from some of his fellow students and opponents who worked alongside him in his movies. The film is directed by Tom Kuhn and Fred Weintraub and written by Davis Miller, author of the books My Dinner with Ali and The Tao of Bruce Lee.

Interviews
Curse of the Dragon contains interviews from the following people:
Chuck Norris, who trained with Lee and starred in Way of the Dragon as Lee's final opponent.
Dan Inosanto, a student of Bruce Lee who appeared in Game of Death as an opponent of Lee.
Kareem Abdul-Jabbar, a professional basketball player and student of Lee who also appeared in Game of Death as Lee's final opponent.
Robert Wall, a student of Chuck Norris who became friends with Lee after meeting him at a Kung-Fu demonstration in San Francisco.
Robert Baker, who starred as Lee's final opponent in Fist of Fury. Baker was a student of Lee's.
Taky Kimura, a student of Lee who was slated to play the second floor guardian in Game of Death. The scene was never shot.
Brandon Lee, the son of Lee, who would die only a year later while filming The Crow.
Linda Lee Cadwell, the wife of Bruce Lee.

Release
In 2000, Bruce Lee: A Warrior's Journey was released, containing lost footage of Lee's Game of Death. DVDs of Curse of the Dragon were released with A Warrior's Journey as a bonus disc after its release. A Warrior's Journey may also be found as a bonus disc on the 2004 special edition of Enter the Dragon.

Other Similar Documentaries
Bruce Lee: The Legend
The Legend of Bruce Lee
Bruce Lee: In His Own Words
Death by Misadventure
Path of the Dragon
Intercepting the Fist
Martial Arts Maser
The Unbeatable Bruce Lee
Bruce Lee: The Man, The Myth
Bruce Lee, My Brother

References

External links
 Bruce Lee Divine Wind
 IMDB
 Rotten Tomatoes 
 Bob Wall Interview

1993 documentary films
1993 films
1990s English-language films